In October 2005, remnants of Tropical Storm Tammy and Subtropical Depression Twenty-Two merged with incoming continental cold fronts to produce torrential rains over interior New England, as well as over parts of New Jersey and New York. Particularly hard hit was the state of New Hampshire, which saw roads and bridges wiped out, several reported deaths, and whole buildings destroyed. Rain lingered over some areas for several weeks.

Meteorological history
In the first week of October 2005, 
On October 5, Tropical Storm Tammy developed off the east coast of Florida, and moved ashore near Atlantic Beach. A larger extratropical storm in the eastern Gulf of Mexico absorbed Tammy on October 7. This low was connected to a cold front that stalled over the Mid-Atlantic states, drawing a plume of moisture from the western Caribbean Sea that brought heavy rainfall to the northeastern United States. By October 9, the frontal low was located over the Gulf of Maine, moving northeastward toward Atlantic Canada. Two days later, the remnants of a subtropical depression merged with a cold front to the east of North Carolina. This new low strengthened to gale force and meandered for two days off the eastern United States, until it was also absorbed by a larger extratropical storm on October 14. The low brought additional rainfall to the northeastern United States.

Effects by state

Rhode Island
With  of rain in October 2005, T. F. Green Airport recorded its wettest month ever. During October 13–15, rainfall was heaviest in central and eastern Massachusetts and Rhode Island. A state of emergency was declared for the state, and thousands were without power. At least 100 residents were evacuated after swift rises in local rivers, and Red Cross shelters were set up throughout the state. Damage in Rhode Island totaled $1.6 million (2005 USD).

Connecticut
Thousands of homes and businesses lost power, primarily in Bridgeport. Localized flooding was reported in certain areas of Connecticut: one death occurred when a woman was swept away at Diana's Pool on the Natchaug River, another death occurred when a man was swept away by the raging waters in a campground in Stafford Springs, and another woman fell into the churning Connecticut River. In addition, the rains softened the soil, creating mudslides that damaged a lengthy stretch of railroad tracks near Naugatuck, interrupting service. Residents in low-lying areas of Shelton, Seymour, Stratford, and Oxford were evacuated as heavy rains forced the Housatonic River out of its banks, inundating homes and businesses. It was the wettest October on record for Hartford. Damage totaled to $6 million (2005 USD).

Massachusetts
Severe inland flooding resulted in $6.5 million in damage. In Greenfield, a trailer park was destroyed, leaving at least 70 people homeless. Officials evacuated 2,000 residents of Taunton when the failing Whittenton Pond Dam threatened to collapse and submerge the city under  of water.  The Massachusetts National Guard drained the reservoir behind the 173-year wooden dam using five high-volume pumps. Once the reservoir was drained, evacuees were allowed to return to their homes, and the Army Corps of Engineers removed the old structure and replaced it with an earthen dam.

New Hampshire
The state of New Hampshire was one of the hardest hit from flooding and mudslides, particularly in the southwestern part. The town of Alstead was especially hard hit, as the Cold River and its tributaries substantially overflowed due to the heavy rain and water flowing downstream, inundating the community. More than 1,000 people were forced to evacuate their homes in the region. Seven deaths were confirmed in the state. In some areas, entire houses were washed off of their foundations. Damages totaled $15.8 million (2005 USD), primarily in Cheshire County.

New Jersey
Flooding was reported in several parts of northern New Jersey. Bergen and Passaic counties were hardest hit, as floodwaters covered several communities to varying degrees. In most places, flooding was the worst seen since 1999's Hurricane Floyd.

Several rivers, including the Pequannock River, Passaic River and Ramapo River, overflowed their banks. Evacuation orders were issued for parts of the towns of Bound Brook, Lodi, Oakland and Westwood during the peak of the flooding. Coastal flooding was also reported along parts of the Jersey Shore. A statewide state of emergency was declared by Governor Richard Codey.

New York
Coastal flooding was a problem on Long Island, and severe beach erosion was reported in many areas.  It was the wettest October on record for Central Park.

Maine
Minor to moderate flooding occurred across the southern half of the state, in such cities as Portland, Bar Harbor, and Bangor.

Pennsylvania
The eastern end of the state suffered significant flooding early in the course of this storm. At 8.71 inches in a matter of hours on October 8, it was the greatest one-day rainfall on record at Lehigh Valley International Airport.

See also
 2005 Atlantic hurricane season
 2006 New England flood

References

External links
The HPC archive for the first event.
The HPC archive for the second event.

2005 meteorology
Floods in the United States
2005 natural disasters